Datu Blah T. Sinsuat, officially the Municipality of Datu Blah T. Sinsuat (Maguindanaon: Inged nu Datu Blah T. Sinsuat; Iranun: Inged a Datu Blah T. Sinsuat), is a  municipality in the province of Maguindanao del Norte, Philippines. According to the 2020 census, it has a population of 28,243 people.

Formerly a part of the town of Upi, Datu Blah T. Sinsuat became another municipality after a plebiscite on September 16, 2006, and pursuant to the Muslim Mindanao Act No. 198 of the ARMM. On October 28, it became a new municipality of the newly created Shariff Kabunsuan province until its nullification by the Supreme Court in July 2008. The orphaned municipality was absorbed by the province of Maguindanao.

This municipality is named after Datu Blah T. Sinsuat, Maguindanao's delegate to the 1935 Constitutional Convention and Cotabato's Lone District Representative to the 2nd Congress of the Philippines.

Geography

Barangays

Datu Blah T. Sinsuat is politically subdivided into 12 barangays.
 Kinimi
 Laguitan
 Lapaken
 Matuber
 Meti
 Nalkan
 Penansaran
 Pura
 Resa
 Sedem
 Sinipak
 Tambak
 Tubuan

Climate

Demographics

Economy

References

External links
 Datu Blah T. Sinsuat Profile at the DTI Cities and Municipalities Competitive Index
 [ Philippine Standard Geographic Code]
 Philippine Census Information
 Local Governance Performance Management System

Municipalities of Maguindanao del Norte